Vasum ceramicum, common name ceramic vase or heavy whelk, is a species of medium to large sea snail, a marine gastropod mollusk in the family Turbinellidae.

Description
Vasum ceramicum has a large, thick and heavy shell that reaches a length of  59 – 160 mm. This shell is quite elongated, conical or vase-shaped (hence the common name). It has long siphonal canal, three strong, columella folds and 7-10 strong spiny tubercles in each loop. It is colored white and greys or dark brown externally, while the aperture may be colored white or pale brown.

Distribution
The species is widespread in the Mascarene Plateau, off the coast of Madagascar, and Tanzania.

Habitat
This sea snail lives on lower eulittoral, rocky areas at depth of 10 to 40 m.

References

 City University of Hong Kong. (2006). Provision of Services for Species Identification and Data Analysis of Epibenthic Organisms from Hong Kong Water. Final report. Environmental Protection Department. Department of Biology and Chemistry, City University 
 Drivas, J. & Jay, M. (1988). Coquillages de La Réunion et de l'Île Maurice. Collection les beautés de la nature. Delachaux et Niestlé: Neuchâtel. ISBN 2-603-00654-1. pp. 1-160.
 Liu, J.Y. [Ruiyu] (ed.). (2008). Checklist of marine biota of China seas. China Science Press. 1267 pp

External links
  Linnaeus, C. (1758). Systema Naturae per regna tria naturae, secundum classes, ordines, genera, species, cum characteribus, differentiis, synonymis, locis. Editio decima, reformata (10th revised edition), vol. 1: 824 pp. Laurentius Salvius: Holmiae.
 Fischer von Waldheim, G. (1807). Museum Demidoff, ou, Catalogue systématique et raisonné des curiosités de la nature et de l'art: données à l'Université Impériale de Moscou par son excellence Monsieur Paul de Demidoff. Tome III. Végétaux et Animaux. Moscow: Imprimerie de Université Impériale de Moscou. 300 pp, 6 pls
 
 Discover Life
 Encyclopedia of life
 Vieoceane

Turbinellidae
Gastropods described in 1758
Taxa named by Carl Linnaeus